USS Seaman (DD-791) was a  of the United States Navy, named for Lieutenant Commander Allen L. Seaman (1916–1944), a naval aviator who was awarded two Navy Crosses for service in the Pacific War.

Seaman was laid down on 10 July 1945 by the Seattle-Tacoma Shipbuilding Corporation, Seattle, Washington; launched on 29 May 1946; sponsored by Mrs. Barbara K. Seaman, widow of Lt. Comdr. Seaman; and delivered, partially complete, on 25 June 1946 to the officer-in-charge of demobilized shipping for the 13th Naval District.

Never commissioned, the destroyer was subsequently placed in the Bremerton Group of the Pacific Reserve Fleet, where she remained until struck from the Navy list on 1 March 1961. Her hulk was sold to the First Steel and Ship Corp., New York City, on 12 September 1961, and was delivered to the Learner Co., Alameda, California, on 22 September 1961 for scrapping.

References

External links  

 

Cancelled ships of the United States Navy
Ships built in Seattle
1946 ships
Gearing-class destroyers of the United States Navy
Pacific Reserve Fleet, Bremerton Group